Chan Nyein is a former Minister for Education of Myanmar (Burma). and a member of the Pyithu Hluttaw, the lower house of the country's national legislature from 2011 to 2016.

References

Education ministers of Myanmar
Members of Pyithu Hluttaw
Burmese engineers
1944 births
2019 deaths
Specially Designated Nationals and Blocked Persons List